Sawtell is a suburb of the City of Coffs Harbour in northern New South Wales, Australia. It borders Toormina to the West.

History 
In 1863, a cutter carrying a load of cedar logs ran aground on what would become Sawtell Beach. A Coffs Harbour farmer named Walter Harvey assembled a team of workers to salvage the logs, and a small settlement developed near the site of the wreck.

Forty years later, the land around Sawtell Beach was purchased and subdivided by Oswald Sawtell for housing and farmland. Sawtell railway station, post office, school and hotel followed soon thereafter and by the 1930s Sawtell had become a thriving coastal village.

The original inhabitants of the land were Indigenous Australians of the Gumbaynggirr clan. The Aboriginal name for the land where the town now stands was Bongil Bongil.

Location 
A suburb of the City of Coffs Harbour, Sawtell is located on the north-eastern coast of New South Wales, adjacent to Toormina and Boambee, and 10 km south of Coffs Harbour. It is served by the North Coast railway line with six New South Wales XPT services daily, three heading north and three south. Sawtell station is an optional stop for all of them.
Coffs Harbour Airport is located just to the north of Sawtell with the runway ending just to the north of the town.

Demographics

Sawtell has a population of 3,490 people. Aboriginal or Torres Strait Islander people make up 3.78% of the population.

Sawtell, Toormina and Boambee (all with postcode 2452) have a combined population of 19,477 people, 5.5% of whom are Aboriginal or Torres Strait Islanders.

Sawtell Beach
Sawtell beach extends north from Sawtell Headland and the sheltered Sailors Bay swimming area to Murray's beach. The beach is patrolled by the local Surf Lifesavers who run Sawtell Surf Club half way along the beach. Due to the dunes there are no true beach front properties on Sawtell Beach. Some properties look over Bonville Creek and some over Murray's Beach. The beach has singing sand when walked on in dry conditions.

Sports and events 
Sawtell has numerous sporting clubs and facilities. The Sawtell Panthers junior and senior Rugby League clubs play out of Rex Hardaker Oval, Toormina – along with Coffs Rugby, and the pigeon racing club. The Sawtell Scorpions are the local soccer club, based at Toormina Oval. The Sawtell Saints are the Australian Rules Football club, based at Richardson Park along with the Sawtell Cricket Club.

Sawtell also has a number of recreation sporting clubs, most notably, Sawtell Golf Club, Sawtell Bowling Club, Sawtell Swimming Club, Sawtell Surf Lifesaving Club and Sawtell Tennis Club.

A number of annual events have been organised by the local Sawtell Chamber of Commerce.

The annual Chilli Festival features over 100 stalls of local and national vendors serving chilli-based food and products. The Festival is one of Sawtell's major annual events and is family oriented.

The New Year's Super Fun Day involves family entertainment, including woodchopping, a fun run, tug of war competitions, and live entertainment on New Year's Day.

The Ben Woods Cricket Tournament, held between Sawtell and Coffs Harbour, takes place during the Christmas Period.

A surfing competition, held at Sawtell Beach, raises money for those living with spinal injuries. Surfers from all over NSW and Queensland come to compete in the event.

Tourism and entertainment
Sawtell has a modern cafe and restaurant scene. Boambee creek offers safe swimming and a walking path around the headland. Sawtell Headland is popular for whale watching. The Cinema has been recently renovated and offers two screens. The usual amenities, bakeries, post office, hotels, motels, laundromat are all available. Sawtell has excellent surf breaks to suit all levels and wind directions.

References

External links
 

Towns in New South Wales
Mid North Coast
Coastal towns in New South Wales